Xylorycta ovata is a moth in the family Xyloryctidae. It was described by Walsingham in 1881. It is found in South Africa (including Gauteng).

The wingspan is about 25 mm. The forewings are pale testaceous-grey, rather shining. There is a single fuscous spot at the end of the cell, beyond which the veins are traceable to the apical margin. The hindwings are rather broader than the forewings, slightly paler greyish cinereous.

References

Endemic moths of South Africa
Xylorycta
Moths described in 1881